Uusi tietosanakirja may refer to:

Uusi tietosanakirja (1929), Finnish encyclopedia
Uusi tietosanakirja (1960), Finnish encyclopedia